Piz Por (3,028 m) is a mountain of the Oberhalbstein Alps, located west of Innerferrera in the canton of Graubünden. It is the culminating point of the group between the Splügen Pass and the Niemet Pass.

References

External links
 Piz Por on Hikr

Mountains of Graubünden
Mountains of the Alps
Mountains of Switzerland